Keraun Harris (born January 17, 1988), better known by his online alias and persona King Keraun, is an actor, comedian, and Internet personality who has appeared on HBO's Insecure, ABC's Black-ish, and Halloween Ends.

Early life 
Harris was born in Houston as the eldest of five children of Derrick Harris, a former National Football League player. In 2009, Harris served a -year term for robbery and credit card abuse convictions in federal prison. After his release from prison, he worked with chemicals on oil fields, which he soon quit because of medical problems caused by the work.

Career 
After quitting his job in the oil fields, Harris started posting funny videos online to pass the time while looking for a new job. His short videos on Instagram (which only allowed videos to be 15 seconds in length) about relationships, family and football brought him to the attention of Russell Simmons who became his mentor. Harris massed more than 1.4 million Instagram followers, 1.8 million Facebook likes, and more than 100 million Vine loops, and used his newfound celebrity status to advertise for multiple companies seeking to use new media to promote their products.

In 2015, Harris was offered a guest role in ABC's Black-ish episode "Chop Shop".

Filmography

Films

Television

References

External links
 

1988 births
Living people
American Internet celebrities
Place of birth missing (living people)